Fort Dickinson was a Pennamite fort with four small blockhouses, armed with four guns, manned by 100 men constructed as part of the Pennamite Wars.

In 1769, Major John Durkee and his men erected Fort Durkee on the eastern bank of the Susquehanna River at the town of Wilkes-Barre, Pennsylvania.  The fort changed hands several times during the conflict in the following decade.  Fort Durkee was renamed Fort Dickinson in 1783. It was destroyed by Connecticut Yankees the following year during the Second Yankee-Pennamite War.

References

Separatism in the United States
Dickinson
Dickinson
Buildings and structures in Luzerne County, Pennsylvania
1769 establishments in Pennsylvania